"My Friend Rabbit" is a children's picture book that was written and illustrated by Eric Rohmann and first published in 2002. The book tells the story of a friendship between a mouse and a rabbit in a lighthearted manner. The illustrations in the book earned Rohmann the Caldecott Medal in 2003. Additionally, "My Friend Rabbit" was adapted into an animated television series in 2007.

Description
"My Friend Rabbit" is a 32-page children's picture book exploring toys, trouble, and friendship themes. The book follows the adventures of a mouse and a rabbit and teaches valuable lessons to young readers about the importance of companionship.

The illustrations in the book have been described as simple yet heartfelt, capturing the essence of childhood and providing a visual accompaniment to the story.

Synopsis
The plot of "My Friend Rabbit" centers around a mouse who loans his new airplane to his best friend, Rabbit, resulting in a series of troublesome events. When the airplane gets stuck in a tree, Rabbit gathers a group of animals in an attempt to retrieve it. However, the plan goes awry and the animals fall, causing them to become angry with Rabbit. Despite this, Mouse remains loyal to his friend and demonstrates the true nature of friendship. In the end, Rabbit comes up with a new idea to retrieve the airplane, leading to further adventures.

"My Friend Rabbit" offers a lighthearted tale about friendship and problem-solving and has been well-received by young readers.

Television series

In the autumn of 2007, Nelvana produced an animated children's television show based on "My Friend Rabbit", which aired on several networks including Qubo, Treehouse TV, Playhouse Disney (UK & Ireland) and Disney Junior (Canada). The program was recognized with several awards, including the Pulcinella Award for Best Preschool TV Series in 2008 and the Alliance of Children's Television award for Best Preschool Series in 2009. The show was also nominated for three Gemini awards in categories that included Best Direction, Best Musical Scoring, and Best Screenwriting. The nominees were Jason Groh for Best Direction, John Welsman for Best Musical Scoring, and Steve Westren for Best Screenwriting. Ultimately, Steve Westren won the award for Best Screenwriting.

Cast/Characters

Main Characters
 Rabbit (Peter Oldring) - A kind and sharing rabbit that gets into all types of situations. His catchphrases are "Thumpeka!", "Carrotastic!", "Time for a hop-think", and "Hip-hopperoo!".
 Mouse (Richard Binsley) - A loving and sharing mouse who is Rabbit's sidekick and best friend who gets into situations which fits him and Rabbit. He does not like water or swimming. He breaks the fourth wall throughout every episode.
 Hazel (Denise Oliver) - The acorn-loving squirrel who is a bit like Mouse as she does not like swimming or she gets a squirrel with a wet tail. She spends most of her time dealing with her acorns.
 Thunder (Jeremy Harris) - A rhinoceros who tends to be a bit "slower" than the other characters, but is cheerful and loves learning new things. He likes making songs most of all.
 Jasper (Milton Barnes) - The fishing-loving alligator. Of all the characters, he seems to be the most mature and knows many things the others do not. When the other characters need to know something, they often go to him for sage advice.
 Edwina (Stacey DePass) - An elephant who acts like everyone's big sister.
 The Gibble Goose Girls - A quartet of goslings that go and do everything together. They each have their own personality but are almost never seen alone. When they talk, they tend to do it all at once: one girl will start a sentence, and each other girl will complete part of the sentence until they finish. Their names are Coral (Isabel de Carteret), Amber (Hannah Endicott-Douglas), Jade (Nissae Isen) and Pearl (Camden Angelis).

Episodes

Season 1
1. Little Dutch Rabbit / Fishing for the Moon
2. Follow the Leader / Chasing Rainbows
3. Mouse's Moss / The Sounds of Silence
4. Hazel's Big Surprise / The Last Leaf
5. A Gift at Last / The Big To Do
6. Muddy Puddle / Silly Pilly
7. Nest Quest / Bouncy Bog
8. Branching Out / Willow Pond Wackadoo
9. I'm Rabbit, I'm Rabbit / Bogged in Fog
10. Strange Bee-haviour / The Flighty Fly
11. Hazel's Voice / The Perfect Rock
12. Thunder the Poet / The Strawberry Patch
13. Sticky Situation / Ladybug Day

Season 2
1. The Greatest Invention / Turtle in a Hurry
2. A Private Place / My Droopy Friend
3. Pearl's Pals / For The Birds
4. Hazel's Noise / Don't Touch Mossy
5. Mouse's Mountain / You Be Me
6. Gibble Goose Girls Galore / Scaredy Skunk
7. Edwina's New Friend / Frog On A Log
8. The Mysterious Acorn Mystery / The Big Goose
9. The Hoppiest Wish / Mouse's Mysterious Something
10. Catch Me If You Can / The Snow Geese
11. Honey and Berries / Birthday Mousey 
12. Sing A Song / Snowed Under
13. Jasper's Frozen Smarts / Thunder's Idea Maker

References

External links

 My Friend Rabbit on Nickelodeon Canada
 My Friend Rabbit on Treehouse
 
 My Friend Rabbit at the Big Cartoon Database

2002 children's books
American children's books
American picture books
Children's fiction books
Adventure fiction
Comedy books
Fantasy books
Caldecott Medal–winning works
Children's books adapted into television shows
English-language books
Books about rabbits and hares
Books about mice and rats
Anthropomorphic animals
Children's books about friendship
Roaring Brook Press books
2000s American children's comedy television series
2000s American animated television series
2007 American television series debuts
2008 American television series endings
2000s Canadian children's television series
2000s Canadian animated television series
2007 Canadian television series debuts
2008 Canadian television series endings
2000s preschool education television series
American flash animated television series
American children's animated adventure television series
American children's animated comedy television series
American children's animated fantasy television series
American preschool education television series
American television shows based on children's books
Canadian flash animated television series
Canadian children's animated adventure television series
Canadian children's animated comedy television series
Canadian children's animated fantasy television series
Canadian preschool education television series
Canadian television shows based on children's books
Animated preschool education television series
English-language television shows
NBC original programming
Ion Television original programming
Telemundo original programming
Treehouse TV original programming
Qubo
Animated series based on books
Animated television series about rabbits and hares
Animated television series about mice and rats
Fictional rhinoceroses
Animated television series about birds
Fictional geese
Animated television series about squirrels
Animated television series about elephants
Animated television series about reptiles and amphibians
Fictional crocodilians
Television shows set in the United States
Forests in fiction
Television series by Nelvana
Television series by Corus Entertainment
Television shows adapted into plays
Television shows adapted into video games
Film and television memes